David Monson Bunis (Hebrew:, born June 3, 1952 to Jacob and Marsha Monsohn Bunis) is a professor in the Department of Hebrew and Jewish Languages, Mandel Institute of Jewish Studies, at the Hebrew University of Jerusalem and heads its program in Judezmo (or Ladino) studies. He is also an advisor to the Israel Autoridad Nasionala del Ladino and a member of the Akademia del Ladino en Israel. He is the editor of Languages and Literatures of Sephardic and Oriental Jews (Jerusalem, 2009), co-editor of Massorot, a Hebrew-language journal devoted to the study of Jewish language traditions, and author of books and articles on the Judezmo language and its literature.

Expanded description
After his doctoral dissertation on the Hebrew-Aramaic component of Modern Judezmo (also known as Judeo-Spanish, Ladino, Spanyol) was accepted in 1980 by the Department of Linguistics, Columbia University, David M. Bunis joined the Faculty of Humanities of the Hebrew University of Jerusalem as its Judezmo Studies specialist. In 2006 Bunis was appointed full professor in the Hebrew University's Department of Hebrew and Jewish Languages. In addition to his teaching responsibilities, Bunis supervised research projects on Judezmo language and literature supported by academic funding agencies in Israel and abroad. He participated in numerous international conferences on Judezmo and Jewish language research. Bunis has served as an advisor to the Israel Autoridad Nasionala del Ladino (National Authority for Ladino Language and Its Culture), the Israel Ministry of Education (Ladino programs), academic institutes in Israel, the United States, and Europe, and research funding agencies in Israel and abroad. He acted as academic chairman of the Misgav Yerushalayim research center (2006-2009), chairman of the Samuel Toledano Prize committee (2004), and a member of the Israel Prize in Jewish languages selection committee (2013). He is co-editor of Massorot and a member of the editorial boards of several journals devoted to linguistics and Jewish languages. In 2006 David Bunis was awarded the Yad Ben Zvi Life’s Work Prize for his pioneering contributions to Judezmo Studies. In 2013 he received the EMET Prize for the Study of Jewish Languages. In 2015 he became an Académico Correspondiente Extranjero of the Real Academia Española and in 2018 a member of the Akademia del Ladino en Israel. Bunis is a descendant of the Monsohn Family of Jerusalem and a grandson of Jerusalem-born Rabbi Menachem Mendel Monsohn.

Books 
A Guide to Reading and Writing Judezmo, New York, The Judezmo Society, 1975, 2d ed., 1976,  / .
Sephardic Studies: A Bibliography for Research, New York, Garland Press & YIVO Institute for Jewish Research, 1981 (Garland reference library of the humanities, vol. 174), . [Rev. M. Boaziz, Bulletin Hispanique 88:1 (1986), 269-270]
A Lexicon of the Hebrew and Aramaic Elements in Modern Judezmo, Jerusalem, Magnes Press, 1993, . With a foreword by Shelomo Morag.
Yiddish Linguistics: A Classified Bilingual Index to Yiddish Serials and Collections, 1913-1958, (with Andrew Sunshine), New York, YIVO Institute for Jewish Research & Garland Press, 1994, .
Voices from Jewish Salonika, Jerusalem, Misgav Yerushalayim, 1999, . (In English, Judezmo, Hebrew.)
Judezmo: An Introduction to the Language of the Ottoman Sephardim, Jerusalem, Magnes Press, 1999, . (In Hebrew.)
Languages and Literatures of Sephardic and Oriental Jews, Jerusalem, Misgav Yerushalayim & Mossad Bialik, 2009, .

See also

External links
 Web Page and Articles Uploaded

Academic staff of the Hebrew University of Jerusalem
Columbia Graduate School of Arts and Sciences alumni
City College of New York alumni
Living people
American emigrants to Israel
20th-century American Jews
Judaeo-Spanish
Linguists from Israel
1952 births
21st-century American Jews